The Eighteenth Dynasty of Egypt (notated Dynasty XVIII, alternatively 18th Dynasty or Dynasty 18) is classified as the first dynasty of the New Kingdom of Egypt, the era in which ancient Egypt achieved the peak of its power. The Eighteenth Dynasty spanned the period from 1550/1549 to 1292 BC. This dynasty is also known as the Thutmosid Dynasty for the four pharaohs named Thutmose.

Several of Egypt's most famous pharaohs were from the Eighteenth Dynasty, including Tutankhamun, whose tomb was found by Howard Carter in 1922. Other famous pharaohs of the dynasty include Hatshepsut (c. 1479 BC–1458 BC), the longest-reigning woman pharaoh of an indigenous dynasty, and Akhenaten (c. 1353–1336 BC), the "heretic pharaoh", with his Great Royal Wife, Nefertiti.
The Eighteenth Dynasty is unique among Egyptian dynasties in that it had two queens regnant, women who ruled as sole pharaoh: Hatshepsut and Neferneferuaten, usually identified as Nefertiti.

History

Early Dynasty XVIII 

Dynasty XVIII was founded by Ahmose I, the brother or son of Kamose, the last ruler of the 17th Dynasty. Ahmose finished the campaign to expel the Hyksos rulers. His reign is seen as the end of the Second Intermediate Period and the start of the New Kingdom. Ahmose's consort, Queen Ahmose-Nefertari was "arguably the most venerated woman in Egyptian history, and the grandmother of the 18th Dynasty." She was deified after she died. Ahmose was succeeded by his son, Amenhotep I, whose reign was relatively uneventful.

Amenhotep I probably left no male heir and the next pharaoh, Thutmose I, seems to have been related to the royal family through marriage. During his reign, the borders of Egypt's empire reached their greatest expanse, extending in the north to Carchemish on the Euphrates and in the south up to Kurgus beyond the fourth cataract of the Nile. Thutmose I was succeeded by Thutmose II and his queen, Hatshepsut, who was the daughter of Thutmose I. After her husband's death and a period of regency for her minor stepson (who would later become pharaoh as Thutmose III) Hatshepsut became pharaoh in her own right and ruled for over twenty years.

Thutmose III, who became known as the greatest military pharaoh ever, also had a lengthy reign after becoming pharaoh. He had a second co-regency in his old age with his son Amenhotep II. Amenhotep II was succeeded by Thutmose IV, who in his turn was followed by his son Amenhotep III, whose reign is seen as a high point in this dynasty.

Amenhotep III's reign was a period of unprecedented prosperity, artistic splendor, and international power, as attested by over 250 statues (more than any other pharaoh) and 200 large stone scarabs discovered from Syria to Nubia. Amenhotep III undertook large scale building programmes, the extent of which can only be compared with those of the much longer reign of Ramesses II during Dynasty XIX. Amenhotep III's consort was the Great Royal Wife Tiye, for whom he built an artificial lake, as described on eleven scarabs.

Akhenaten, the Amarna Period, and Tutankhamun 

Amenhotep III may have shared the throne for up to twelve years with his son Amenhotep IV. There is much debate about this proposed co-regency, with different experts considering that there was a lengthy co-regency, a short one, or none at all.

In the fifth year of his reign, Amenhotep IV changed his name to Akhenaten ("Effective for the Aten") and moved his capital to Amarna, which he named Akhetaten. During the reign of Akhenaten, the Aten (jtn, the sun disk) became, first, the most prominent deity, and eventually came to be considered the only god. Whether this amounted to true monotheism continues to be the subject of debate within the academic community. Some state that Akhenaten created a monotheism, while others point out that he merely suppressed a dominant solar cult by the assertion of another, while he never completely abandoned several other traditional deities.

Later Egyptians considered this "Amarna Period" an unfortunate aberration. After his death, Akhenaten was succeeded by two short-lived pharaohs, Smenkhkare and Neferneferuaten, of which little is known. In 1334 Akhenaten's son, Tutankhaten, ascended to the throne: shortly after, he restored Egyptian polytheist cult and subsequently changed his name in Tutankhamun, in honor to the Egyptian god Amun. His infant daughters, 317a and 317b mummies, represent the final genetically related generation of the Eighteenth Dynasty.

Ay and Horemheb 

The last two members of the Eighteenth Dynasty—Ay and Horemheb—became rulers from the ranks of officials in the royal court, although Ay might also have been the maternal uncle of Akhenaten as a fellow descendant of Yuya and Tjuyu.

Ay may have married the widowed Great Royal Wife and young half-sister of Tutankhamun, Ankhesenamun, in order to obtain power; she did not live long afterward. Ay then married Tey, who was originally Nefertiti's wet-nurse.

Ay's reign was short. His successor was Horemheb, a general during Tutankhamun's reign whom the pharaoh may have intended as his successor in case he had no surviving children, which is what came to pass. Horemheb may have taken the throne away from Ay in a coup d'état. Although Ay's son or stepson Nakhtmin was named as his father/stepfather's Crown Prince, Nakhtmin seems to have died during the reign of Ay, leaving the opportunity for Horemheb to claim the throne next.

Horemheb also died without surviving children, having appointed his vizier, Pa-ra-mes-su, as his heir. This vizier ascended the throne in 1292 BC as Ramesses I, and was the first pharaoh of the Nineteenth Dynasty.

This example to the right depicts a man named Ay who achieved the exalted religious positions of Second Prophet of Amun and High Priest of Mut at Thebes. His career flourished during the reign of Tutankhamun, when the statue was made. The cartouches of King Ay, Tutankhamun's successor appearing on the statue, were an attempt by an artisan to "update" the sculpture.

Relations with Nubia
The Eighteenth Dynasty empire conquered all of Lower Nubia under Thutmose I. By the reign of Thutmose III, the Egyptians directly controlled Nubia to the Nile river, 4th cataract, With Egyptian influence / tributaries extending beyond this point. The Egyptians referred to the area as Kush and it was administered by the Viceroy of Kush. The 18th dynasty obtained Nubian gold, animal skins, ivory, ebony, cattle, and horses, which were of exceptional quality. The Egyptians built temples throughout Nubia. One of the largest and most important temples was dedicated to amun at Jebel Barkal in the city of Napata. This Temple of Amun was enlarged by later Egyptian and Nubian Pharaohs, such as Taharqa.

Relations with the Near-East
After the end of the Hyksos period of foreign rule, the Eighteenth Dynasty engaged in a vigorous phase of expansionism, conquering vast areas of the Near-East, with especially Pharaoh Thutmose III submitting the "Shasu" Bedouins of northern Canaan, and the land of Retjenu, as far as Syria and Mittani in numerous military campaigns circa 1450 BC.

Dating
Radiocarbon dating suggests that Dynasty XVIII may have started a few years earlier than the conventional date of 1550 BC. The radiocarbon date range for its beginning is 1570–1544 BC, the mean point of which is 1557 BC.

Pharaohs of the 18th Dynasty

The pharaohs of Dynasty XVIII ruled for approximately 250 years (c. 1550–1298 BC). The dates and names in the table are taken from Dodson and Hilton. Many of the pharaohs were buried in the Valley of the Kings in Thebes (designated KV). More information can be found on the Theban Mapping Project website. Several diplomatic marriages are known for the New Kingdom. These daughters of foreign kings are often only mentioned in cuneiform texts and are not known from other sources. The marriages were likely to have been a way to confirm good relations between these states.

Timeline of the 18th Dynasty

Gallery of images

See also
 Egyptian chronology

References

Bibliography

External links
 Hatshepsut: from Queen to Pharaoh, an exhibition catalog from The Metropolitan Museum of Art (fully available online as PDF)

 
States and territories established in the 16th century BC
States and territories disestablished in the 13th century BC
18
18
16th century BC in Egypt
15th century BC in Egypt
14th century BC in Egypt
13th century BC in Egypt
16th-century BC establishments in Egypt
13th century BC disestablishments in Egypt
2nd millennium BC in Egypt

de:Neues Reich#18. Dynastie